Mieczysław Józef Mąkosza (born 16 November 1934) is a Polish chemist specializing in organic synthesis and investigation of organic mechanisms. Along with Jerzy Winiarski he is credited for the discovery of the aromatic vicarious nucleophilic substitution, VNS. He also contributed to the discovery of phase transfer catalysis reactions. From 1979 to 2005 he was director of the Institute of Organic Chemistry of the Polish Academy of Sciences.

References

1934 births
Polish chemists
Living people
Recipients of the State Award Badge (Poland)